Mashhad (Mash-hed transliteration, martyrium) is an Arab town located  northeast of Nazareth in Israel's Northern District.

History
Remains from the Early Bronze Age, Persian, Roman and Byzantine eras have been found.

Mashhad is located on the site of Gath-hepher, an ancient Israelite town mentioned in the Hebrew Bible as the home of Jonah; its supposed tomb is still pointed out by locals.

Ottoman Empire 
In 1517, the village was incorporated into the Ottoman Empire with the rest of Palestine, and in 1596 it appeared in the Ottoman tax registers under the name of Mashad Yunis, as being in the nahiya (subdistrict) of Tabariyya, part of  Safad Sanjak. It had a population of 31 households and 6 bachelors, all Muslim.  They paid a fixed tax rate of 20% on agricultural products, which included  wheat and barley, fruit trees, vegetable and fruit garden, orchard, as well as on goats and/or beehives; a total of 865 Akçe. All of the revenue went to a waqf.

A map from Napoleon's invasion of 1799 by Pierre Jacotin showed the place, named as El Mecheb.

In 1838 it was noted as a Muslim village in the Nazareth district.

In 1875, the French explorer Victor Guérin visited the village, which he estimated had at most 300 inhabitants.
In 1881, the PEF's Survey of Western Palestine (SWP)  described Meshed as "A small village, built of stone, surrounding the traditional tomb of Jonah -a low building surmounted by two white-washed domes. It contains about 300 Moslems, and is situated on the top of a hill, without gardens. The water supply is from cisterns."

A population list from about 1887 showed that  el Meshed had about 450 inhabitants; all Muslims.

British Mandate 
In the 1922 census of Palestine, conducted by the British Mandate authorities, Mashad had a total population of 356, all Muslim, which had increased in the 1931 census to 487; 486 Muslims and 1 Christian, in a total of 111 houses.

In the  1945 statistics  the population was 660, all Muslims,  with 11,067  dunams of land, according to an official land and population survey. Of this, 378 dunams were for plantations and irrigable land,  4,663 for cereals, while 24 dunams were built-up land.

Israel 
Mashhad became a local council in 1960.

See also
 Arab localities in Israel

References

Bibliography

External links
Welcome To Mashhad
Survey of Western Palestine, Map 6:  IAA, Wikimedia commons 

Arab localities in Israel
Local councils in Northern District (Israel)